Belsta River is an album by Hungarian guitarist Gábor Szabó featuring performances recorded in Stockholm in 1977 and released on the Swedish Four Leaf Clover label.

Reception
The Allmusic review states "this was Szabo's last fine moment on record, but what a moment it was".

Track listing
All compositions by Gábor Szabó except as indicated
 "24 Carat" - 14:05 
 "Django" (John Lewis) - 4:15 
 "First Tune in the Morning" - 13:11 
 "Stormy" (Buddy Buie, James Cobb) - 8:32

The album was recorded at Europa Film Studio in Stockholm, Sweden on January 6 & 7, 1978

Personnel
Gábor Szabó - guitar
Janne Schaffer - guitar
Wlodek Gulgowski - piano, electric piano synthesizer
Pekka Pohjola - bass
Malando Gassama - conga, percussion
Peter Sundell - drums

References

Gábor Szabó albums
1978 albums